Olga Petrusyova (born 22 April 1953) is a Russian former swimmer. She competed in the women's 800 metre freestyle at the 1972 Summer Olympics the Soviet Union.

References

1953 births
Living people
Russian female swimmers
Olympic swimmers of the Soviet Union
Swimmers at the 1972 Summer Olympics
Place of birth missing (living people)
Soviet female swimmers
Russian female freestyle swimmers